The Louvre Palace, often referred to simply as the Louvre, is an iconic French palace located on the Right Bank of the Seine in Paris, occupying a vast expanse of land between the Tuileries Gardens and the church of Saint-Germain l'Auxerrois. Originally a military facility, it has served numerous government-related functions in the past, including intermittently as a royal residence between the 14th and 18th centuries. It is now mostly used by the Louvre Museum, which first opened there in 1793.

Whereas the area had been inhabited for thousands of years, the Louvre's history starts around 1190 with its first construction as a castle defending the western front of the Wall of Philip II Augustus. The Louvre's oldest section still standing above ground, its Lescot Wing, dates from the late 1540s, when Francis I started the replacement of the medieval castle with a new design inspired by classical antiquity and Italian Renaissance architecture. Most parts of the current building were constructed in the 17th and 19th centuries.

For more than three centuries, the history of the Louvre has been closely intertwined with that of the Tuileries Palace, created to the west of the Louvre by Catherine de' Medici in 1564 and finally demolished in 1883. The Tuileries was the main seat of French executive power during the last third of that period, from the return of Louis XVI and his court from Versailles in October 1789 until the palace was set on fire during the Paris Commune of 1871. The Pavillon de Flore and Pavillon de Marsan, which used to respectively mark the southern and northern ends of the Tuileries, are now considered part of the Louvre Palace. The Carrousel Garden, first created in the late 19th century in what used to be the great courtyard of the Tuileries (or Cour du Carrousel), is now considered part of the Tuileries Garden. A less high-profile but historically significant dependency of the Louvre was to its immediate east, the Hôtel du Petit-Bourbon, appropriated by the monarchy following the betrayal of the Constable of Bourbon in 1523 and mostly demolished in October 1660 to give way to the Louvre's expansion. The last remains of the Petit-Bourbon were cleared in the 1760s.

General description

This sections provides a summary description of the present-day complex and its main constituent parts.

Location and layout

The complex occupies about 40 hectares with buildings distributed around two main open spaces: the eastern Cour Carrée (square courtyard), which is closed by four wings that form the square of its name, and the central Cour Napoléon, which is open on its western side, beyond the thoroughfare known as Place du Carrousel, towards the Carrousel Garden and the rest of the Tuileries Garden.

The Louvre is slightly askew of the Historic Axis (Axe historique), a roughly eight-kilometer (five-mile) architectural line bisecting the city. The axis begins with the Louvre courtyard, at a point now symbolically marked by a lead copy of Bernini's equestrian statue of Louis XIV, and runs west along the Champs-Élysées to La Défense and slightly beyond.

Since 1988, the Louvre Pyramid in the middle of the Cour Napoléon has marked the center of the Louvre complex. At the same time, the Louvre Museum has adopted a toponymy developed by the Carbone Smolan Agency to refer to the three clusters of buildings that surround that central focus point: 
 To the east, the "Sully Wing" is the square-shaped set of buildings that surrounds the Cour Carrée, named after Maximilien de Béthune, Duke of Sully. It includes the 16th-century Lescot Wing and the footprint of the Medieval Louvre whose remains are displayed underground; 
 To the south, the "Denon Wing" is the array of buildings between the Cour Napoléon and the Seine, named after the Louvre's first director Vivant Denon. the Louvre's southwestern wing is the Aile de Flore. The long Grande Galerie runs on the first floor for much of the length of this building, on the Seine-facing side. 
 To the north, the "Richelieu Wing" is the almost-symmetrical array of buildings between the Cour Napoléon and the rue de Rivoli, named after Cardinal Richelieu.

The Louvre Museum occupies most of the palace's space, but not all of it. The main other users are at the building's two western tips: in the southwestern Aile de Flore, the École du Louvre and Center for Research and Restoration of Museums of France (C2RMF); and in the northwestern Aile de Marsan, the Musée des Arts Décoratifs. In total, some 51,615 square meters (555,000 square feet) in the palace complex are devoted to public exhibition floor space.

Many sections of the Louvre are referred to as "wings" and "pavilions" – typically, the pavilions are the blocks at either the end or the center of a wing. In the Louvre's context, the word "wing" does not denote a peripheral location: the Lescot Wing, in particular, was built as the Louvre's main corps de logis. Given the Louvre wings' length and the fact that they typically abutted parts of the city with streets and private buildings, several of them have passageways on the ground floor which in the Louvre's specific context are called .

Toponymy

The origin of the name Louvre is unclear. French historian Henri Sauval, probably writing in the 1660s, stated that he had seen "in an old Latin-Saxon glossary, Leouar is translated castle" and thus took Leouar to be the origin of Louvre. According to Keith Briggs, Sauval's theory is often repeated, even in recent books, but this glossary has never been seen again, and Sauval's idea is viewed as obsolete. Briggs suggests that H. J. Wolf's proposal in 1969 that Louvre derives instead from Latin Rubras, meaning "red soil", is more plausible. David Hanser suggests instead that the word may come from French , a "place where dogs were trained to chase wolves".

Beyond the name of the palace itself, the toponymy of the Louvre can be treacherous. Partly because of the building's long history and links to changing politics, different names have applied at different times to the same structures or rooms. In some cases, the same name has designated different parts of the building at different times.

Sully Wing

The Sully Wing forms a square of approximately  side length. The section between the Pavillon du Roi and the Pavillon Sully, known as the Lescot Wing as it was designed by architect Pierre Lescot, is the oldest standing part of the entire Louvre Palace. The section between the Pavillon Sully and the Pavillon de Beauvais, which was modeled after the Lescot Wing by architect Jacques Lemercier, is similarly known as the Lemercier Wing.

Denon and Flore Wings

On the southern side of the Cour Napoléon, the Denon Wing's three main pavilions are named respectively, from east to west, after Napoleon-era officials Pierre Daru, Vivant Denon and Nicolas François Mollien.

Richelieu and Marsan Wings

Similarly, on the northern side of the Cour Napoléon are, from east to west, the pavilions named after Jean-Baptiste Colbert, Cardinal Richelieu, and Anne Robert Jacques Turgot.

Pyramid and underground spaces

The Louvre Pyramid, built in the 1980s on a design by I. M. Pei, is now the centerpiece of the entire Louvre complex. It leads to the underground  which in turn serves a vast complex of underground spaces, including the Carrousel du Louvre commercial mall around an inverted pyramid further west.

Architectural style

The present-day Louvre Palace is a vast complex of wings and pavilions which, although superficially homogeneous in scale and architecture, is the result of many phases of building, modification, destruction and reconstruction. Its apparent stylistic consistency is largely due to conscious efforts of architects over several centuries to echo each other's work and preserve a strong sense of historical continuity, mirroring that of the French monarchy and state; American essayist Adam Gopnik has written that "The continuity the Louvre represents is the continuity of the French state." For example, from the 1620s to the 1650s Jacques Lemercier thoroughly replicated the Lescot Wing's patterns for his design of the northern half of the western wing of the Cour Carrée. In the 1660s Louis Le Vau echoed Lemercier's Pavillon de l'Horloge for his redesign of the central pavillon of the Tuileries Palace further west (burnt in 1871 and demolished in 1883), and mostly continued Lescot's and Lemercier's pattern for the completion of the Cour Carrée. A separate design a few years later, that associated with Claude Perrault for the Louvre Colonnade, included window shapes on the ground level based on Lescot's for the Pavillon du Roi a century earlier, ensuring visual continuity even though the dramatic colonnade on the upper level was different from anything that had been done at the Louvre so far. In the 1810s, Percier and Fontaine copied the giant order of the western section of the Grande Galerie, built in the early 17th century and attributed to Jacques II Androuet du Cerceau, for their design of the northern wing to connect the Tuileries with the Louvre along the rue de Rivoli. In the 1850s during Napoleon III's Louvre expansion, architects Louis Visconti then Hector Lefuel built the Denon and Richelieu pavilions as echoes of Lemercier's Pavillon de l'Horloge. In the 1860s and 1870s, Lefuel used designs inspired by the Lescot Wing even as he replaced the prior giant-order patterns created by Androuet du Cerceau and replicated by Percier and Fontaine. Finally, in the 1980s, I. M. Pei made explicit reference to André Le Nôtre, the designer of the Tuileries Garden, for his design of the Louvre Pyramid.

Building history

This section focuses on matters of design, construction and decoration, leaving aside the fitting or remodeling of exhibition spaces within the museum, which are described in the article Louvre. No fewer than twenty building campaigns have been identified in the history of the Louvre Palace. The architect of the largest such campaign, Hector Lefuel, crisply summarized the identity of the complex by noting: "" (translatable as "The Louvre is a building that has gone through a lot"). In the early 1920s Henri Verne, who would soon become the Louvre's Director, noted that "it has become, through the very slow pace of its development, the most representative monument of our national life."

Late 12th and 13th centuries

In 1190 King Philip II of France, who was about to leave for the Third Crusade, ordered the construction of a defensive wall all around Paris. To protect the city, he opted to build the Louvre as a fortress just outside the wall's junction with the Seine on its right bank, on the road to the Duchy of Normandy that was still controlled by his English rivals. Completed in 1202, the new fortress was situated in what is now the southwest quadrant of the Cour Carrée, and some of its remains, excavated between late 1983 and late 1985, are conserved underground.

The original Louvre was nearly square in plan, at seventy-eight by seventy-two meters, and enclosed by a 2.6-metre thick crenellated and machicolated curtain wall. The entire structure was surrounded by a water-filled moat. On the outside of the walls were ten round defensive towers: one at each corner and at the center of the northern and western sides, and two pairs respectively flanking the narrow gates on the southern and eastern sides.

The keep was encircled by a deep, dry ditch with stone counterscarps to help prevent the scaling of its walls with ladders. Accommodations in the fortress were supplied by the vaulted chambers of the keep as well as two wings built against the insides of the curtain walls of the western and southern sides. The circular plans of the towers and the keep avoided the dead angles created by square or rectangular designs which allowed attackers to approach out of firing range. Cylindrical keeps were typical of French castles at the time, but few were as large as the Louvre's .

14th century

In the late 1350s, the growth of the city and the insecurity brought by the Hundred Years' War led Etienne Marcel, provost of the merchants (i.e. municipal leader) of Paris, to initiate the construction of a new protective wall beyond that of Philip II. King Charles V continued the project in the 1360s, and it was later known as the Wall of Charles V. From its westernmost point at the Tour du Bois, the new wall extended east along the north bank of the Seine to the old wall, enclosing the Louvre and greatly reducing its military value. Remains of that wall have been uncovered and reconstructed in the present-day Louvre's Carrousel du Louvre.

Shortly after becoming king in 1364 Charles V abandoned the Palais de la Cité, which he associated with the insurgency led by Etienne Marcel, and made the Louvre into a royal residence for the first time, with the transformation designed by his architect . This was a political statement as well as a utility project – one scholar wrote that Charles V "made the Louvre his political manifesto in stone" and referred to it as "a remarkably discursive monument-a form of architectural rhetoric that proclaimed the revitalization of France after years of internal strife and external menace." The curtain wall was pierced with windows, new wings added to the courtyard, and elaborate chimneys, turrets, and pinnacles to the top.

15th century

In the late 14th and early 15th centuries, the preferred royal residence in Paris was the Hôtel Saint-Pol in what became the Marais, until the Armagnac–Burgundian Civil War resulted in the monarchy leaving Paris altogether; in the 1420s and 1430s Charles VII resided largely at or near Bourges, whereas his rival English claimant Henry VI's representative, the Duke of Bedford, generally resided in his base of Rouen, and while in Paris in his Hôtel des Tournelles. Even after Charles VII's ceremonial entry into Paris in 1437 and after the effective end of the Hundred Years' War in 1453, French monarchs preferred residing in the Châteaux of the Loire Valley, the Palace of Fontainebleau or, when in Paris, at the Château de Vincennes or the Hôtel des Tournelles. Meanwhile, the Louvre Castle was left in a state of increasing disrepair, even as it remained used as an arsenal and prison.

16th century

In 1528, after returning from his captivity in Spain following his defeat at Pavia, Francis I ordered the demolition of the Louvre's old keep. In 1546 he formally commissioned the architect Pierre Lescot and sculptor Jean Goujon to modernize the Louvre into a Renaissance style palace, but the project appears to have actually started in 1545 since Lescot ordered stone deliveries in December of that year. The death of Francis I in 1547 interrupted the work, but it restarted under Francis's successor Henry II who on 10 July 1549 ordered changes in the building's design.

Lescot tore down the western wing of the old Louvre Castle and rebuilt it as what has become known as the Lescot Wing, ending on the southern side with the Pavillon du Roi. In the latter, he designed in 1556 the ceiling for Henry II's bedroom, still largely preserved after relocation in 1829 to the Louvre's Colonnade Wing, for which he departed from the French tradition of beamed ceilings.

During the early 1560s, Lescot demolished the southern wing of the old Louvre and started to replace it with a duplication of the Lescot Wing. His plan may have been to create a square complex of a similar size as the old Louvre, not dissimilar to the Château d'Écouen that had been recently completed on Jean Bullant's design, with an identical third wing to the north and a lower, entrance wing on the eastern side. A contested hypothesis attributes to Lescot the first intent to extend the Louvre's courtyard to its current size by doubling the lengths of the wings, even though no implementation was made of such plans until the 1620s.

Lescot is also credited with the design of the Petite Galerie, which ran from the southwest corner of the Louvre to the Seine. All work stopped in the late 1560s, however, as the Wars of Religion gathered momentum.

In the meantime, beginning in 1564, Catherine de' Medici directed the building of a new residence to the west, outside the wall of Charles V. It became known as the Tuileries Palace because it was built on the site of old tile factories. Architect Philibert de l'Orme started the project, and was replaced after his death in 1570 by Jean Bullant. A letter of March 1565 indicates that Catherine de' Medici already considered a building to connect the Tuileries with the older Louvre building.

From early 1595 he directed the construction of the Grande Galerie, designed by his competing architects Louis Métezeau and Jacques II Androuet du Cerceau, who are respectively credited with the eastern and western sections of the building by a long tradition of scholarship. This major addition, about 460 meters long, was built along the bank of the Seine. A portrait of Marie de' Medici by Frans Pourbus the Younger, still in the Louvre, is a rare remnant of this series.

17th century

In 1624, Louis XIII initiated the construction on a new building echoing the Pavillon du Roi on the northern end of the Lescot Wing, now known as the Pavillon de l'Horloge, and of a wing further north that would start the quadrupling of the Louvre's courtyard. Architect Jacques Lemercier won the design competition against Jean Androuet du Cerceau, Clément II Métezeau, and the son of Salomon de Brosse. The works were stopped in 1628 at a time of hardship for the kingdom and state finances, and only progressed very slowly if at all until 1639. In 1639 Lemercier started a new building campaign during which the Pavillon de l'Horloge was completed. Its second staircase, mirroring Lescot's  to the north, was still unfinished when the Fronde again interrupted the works in the 1640s, and its decoration has never been completed since then.

On the southern side, Lemercier commissioned Nicolas Poussin to decorate the ceiling of the Grande Galerie. Poussin arrived from Rome in early 1641, but returned to Italy in November 1642 leaving the work unfinished. During Louis XIV's minority and the Fronde, from 1643 to 1652 the Louvre was left empty as the royal family stayed at the Palais-Royal or outside of Paris; the Grande Galerie served as a wheat warehouse and deteriorated.

On 21 October 1652, the king and the court ceremonially re-entered the Louvre and made it their residence again, initiating a new burst of construction that would last to the late 1670s.

Meanwhile Anne of Austria, like Marie de' Medici as queen mother before her, inhabited the ground-floor apartment in the Cour Carrée's southern wing. She extended it to the ground floor of the Petite Galerie, which had previously been the venue for the King's Council That "summer apartment" was fitted by architect Louis Le Vau, who had succeeded Lemercier upon the latter's death in 1654.

In 1659, Louis XIV instigated a new phase of construction under Le Vau and painter Charles Le Brun. Le Vau oversaw the remodeling and completion of the Tuileries Palace, and at the Louvre, the completion of the walls of the north wing and of the eastern half of the south wing. Most of the northern wing was completed in the mid-1660s, though without a salient central pavilion as had been built on the west and south (Pavillon de l'Horloge, Pavillon des Arts) or on the southwestern and northwestern corners (Pavillon du Roi, Pavillon de Beauvais).

Le Vau was tasked by Louis XIV to lead the reconstruction. From 1668 to 1678 the Grande Galerie was also decorated with wood panelling, even though that work was left unfinished. The Salon Carré, however, was still undecorated when the court left for Versailles in the late 1670s. Meanwhile, landscape architect André Le Nôtre redesigned the Tuileries, first created in 1564 in the Italian style, as a French formal garden.

The other major project of the 1660s was to create the Louvre's façade towards the city and thus complete the Cour Carrée on its eastern side. It involved a convoluted process, with the king's minister Jean-Baptiste Colbert first sidelining Le Vau and then summoning Gian Lorenzo Bernini from Italy. Bernini stayed in Paris from May 1665 to 1666 but none of his five striking designs gained approval, even though some building works started on their basis. Eventually a committee comprising Le Vau, Charles Le Brun and Claude Perrault produced a symmetrical and classical design featuring a giant Corinthian order colonnade with paired columns. Works started in 1667 and the exterior structures were largely completed by 1674, but would not be fully decorated and roofed until the early 19th century under Napoleon. To harmonize the Louvre's exterior, the decision was made in 1668 to create a new façade in front of Le Vau's for the southern wing, designed by the same architectural committee, albeit not on the northern side whose earlier design by Le Vau was just being completed.

The works at the Louvre, however, stopped in the late 1670s as the king redirected all construction budgets at the Palace of Versailles, despite his minister Colbert's insistence on completing the Louvre. Louis XIV had already left the Louvre from the beginning of 1666, immediately after the death of his mother Anne of Austria in her ground-floor apartment, and would never reside there again, preferring Versailles, Vincennes, Saint-Germain-en-Laye, or if he had to be in Paris, the Tuileries. From the 1680s a new era started for the Louvre, with comparatively little external construction and fragmentation of its interior spaces across a variety of different uses.

18th century

After the definitive departure of the royal court for Versailles in 1682, the Louvre became occupied by multiple individuals and organizations, either by royal favor or simply squatting. Its tenants included the infant Mariana Victoria of Spain during her stay in Paris in the early 1720s, artists, craftsmen, the Academies, and various royal officers. After Bonneval's death in 1766 his family was able to keep the house for a few more years. Some new houses were even erected in the middle of the Cour Carrée, but were eventually torn down on the initiative of the Marquis de Marigny in early 1756. A follow-up 1758 decision led to the clearance of buildings on most of what is now the Place du Louvre in front of the Colonnade, except for the remaining parts of the Hôtel du Petit-Bourbon which were preserved for a few more years.

Marigny had ambitious plans for the completion of the Cour Carrée, but their execution was cut short in the late 1750s by the adverse developments of the Seven Years' War. Jacques-Germain Soufflot in 1759 led the demolition of the upper structures of Le Vau's dome above the Pavillon des Arts, whose chimneys were in poor condition, and designed the northern and eastern passageways of the Cour Carrée in the late 1750s.

The 1790s were a time of turmoil for the Louvre as for the rest of France. On 5 October 1789, the king and court were forced to return from Versailles and settled in the Tuileries Palace; many courtiers moved into the Louvre. Many of these in turn emigrated during the French Revolution, and more artists swiftly moved into their vacated Louvre apartments.

19th century

In December 1804, Napoleon appointed Pierre Fontaine as architect of the Tuileries and the Louvre. Fontaine had forged a strong professional bond with his slightly younger colleague Charles Percier. Between 1805 and 1810 Percier and Fontaine completed the works of the Cour Carrée that had been left unfinished since the 1670s, despite Marigny's repairs around 1760. They opted to equalize its northern and southern wing with an attic modeled on the architecture of the Colonnade wing, thus removing the existing second-floor ornamentation and sculptures, of which some were by Jean Goujon and his workshop. The Cour Carrée and Colonnade wing were completed in 1808–1809, and Percier and Fontaine created the monumental staircase on the latter's southern and northern ends between 1807 and 1811. Percier and Fontaine also created the monumental decoration of most of the ground-floor rooms around the Cour Carrée, most of which still retain it, including their renovation of Jean Goujon's . On the first floor, they recreated the former  of the Lescot Wing, which had been partitioned in the 18th century, and gave it double height by creating a visitors' gallery in what had formerly been the Lescot Wing's attic.

Further west, Percier and Fontaine created the monumental entrance for the Louvre Museum (called  since 1804). The entrance door was dominated by a colossal bronze head of the emperor by Lorenzo Bartolini, installed in 1805. The two architects also remade the interior design of the Grande Galerie, in which they created nine sections separated by groups of monumental columns, and a system of roof lighting with lateral skylights.

On the eastern front of the Tuileries Palace, Percier and Fontaine had the existing buildings cleared away to create a vast open space, the Cour du Carrousel, which they had closed with an iron fence in 1801. Somewhat ironically, the clearance effort was facilitated by the Plot of the rue Saint-Nicaise, a failed bomb attack on Napoleon on 24 December 1800, which damaged many of the neighborhood's building that were later demolished without compensation. In the middle of the Cour du Carrousel, the Arc de Triomphe du Carrousel was erected in 1806–1808 to commemorate Napoleon's military victories. Works started immediately afterwards to build an entirely new wing starting from the Pavillon de Marsan, with the intent to expand it all the way to the Pavillon de Beauvais on the northwestern corner of the Cour Carrée. The architectural design of the southern façade of that wing replicated that attributed to Jacques II Androuet du Cerceau for the western section of the Grande Galerie.

Percier and Fontaine were retained by Louis XVIII at the beginning of the Bourbon Restoration, and kept working on the decoration projects they had started under Napoleon. The  was opened to the public on 25 August 1819. But there were no further budget allocations for the completion of the Louvre Palace during the reigns of Louis XVIII, Charles X and Louis-Philippe I, while the kings resided in the Tuileries.

From the early days of the Second Republic, a greater level of ambition for the Louvre was again signaled. In a February 1849 speech at the National Assembly, Victor Hugo described the project as making the Louvre into a focal point for world culture, which he referred to a "Mecca of intelligence".

No new buildings had been started, however, by the time of the December 1851 coup d'état.

On this basis, Napoleon III was able to finally unite the Louvre with the Tuileries in a single, coherent building complex. The plan of the Louvre's expansion were made by Louis Visconti, a disciple of Percier, who died suddenly in December 1853 and was succeeded in early 1854 by Hector Lefuel. Lefuel developed Visconti's plan into a higher and more ornate building concept, and executed it at record speed so that the "" was inaugurated by the emperor on 14 August 1857. The new buildings were arranged around the space then called , later  and, since the 20th century, Cour Napoléon.

At the end of the Paris Commune on 23 May 1871, the Tuileries Palace was burned down, as also was the Louvre Imperial Library in what is now the Richelieu Wing. The rest of palace, including the museum, was saved by the efforts of troopers, firemen and museum curators.

In the 1870s, the ever-resourceful Lefuel led the repairs to the Pavillon de Flore between 1874 and 1879, reconstructed the wing that had hosted the Louvre Library between 1873 and 1875, and the Pavillon de Marsan between 1874 and 1879. In 1877, a bronze Genius of Arts by Antonin Mercié was installed in the place of Antoine-Louis Barye's equestrian statue of Napoleon III, which had been toppled in September 1870.

Meanwhile, the fate of the Tuileries' ruins kept being debated. Both Lefuel and influential architect Eugène Viollet-le-Duc advocated their preservation and the building reconstruction, but after the latter died in 1879 and Lefuel in 1880, the Third Republic opted to erase that memory of the former monarchy. The final decision was made in 1882 and executed in 1883, thus forever changing the Louvre's layout. Later projects to rebuild the Tuileries have resurfaced intermittently but never went very far.

A tall  was planned in 1884 and erected in 1888 in front of the two gardens on what is now the Cour Napoléon. That initiative carried heavy political symbolism, since Gambetta was widely viewed as the founder of the Third Republic, and his outsized celebration in the middle of Napoleon III's landmark thus affirmed the final victory of republicanism over monarchism nearly a century after the French Revolution. Most of the monument's sculptures were in bronze and in 1941 were melted for military use by German occupying forces. What remained of the Gambetta Monument was dismantled in 1954.

20th century

Aside from the interior refurbishment of the Pavillon de Flore in the 1960s, there was little change to the Louvre's architecture during most of the 20th century.

In September 1981, newly elected French President François Mitterrand proposed the Grand Louvre plan to move the Finance Ministry out of the Richelieu Wing, allowing the museum to expand dramatically. American architect I. M. Pei was awarded the project and in late 1983 proposed a modernist glass pyramid for the central courtyard. A second phase of the Grand Louvre project, completed in 1993, created underground space below the Place du Carrousel to accommodate car parks, multi-purpose exhibition halls and a shopping mall named Carrousel du Louvre. Daylight is provided at the intersection of its axes by the Louvre Inverted Pyramid, "a humorous reference to its bigger, right-side-up sister upstairs." The Louvre's new spaces in the reconstructed Richelieu Wing were near-simultaneously inaugurated in November 1993. The third phase of the Grand Louvre, mostly executed by the late 1990s, involved the refurbishment of the museum's galleries in the Sully and Denon Wings where much exhibition space had been freed during the project second phase. The renovation of the Carrousel Garden was also completed in 2001

21st century

The renovation of the Carrousel Garden was also completed in 2001

Uses

Whereas the name "Louvre Palace" refers to its intermittent role as a monarchical residence, this is neither its original nor its present function. The Louvre has always been associated with French state power and representation, under many modalities that have varied within the vast building and across its long history. Percier and Fontaine thus captured something of the long-term identity of the Louvre when they described it in 1833 as "viewed as the shrine of [French] monarchy, now much less devoted to the usual residence of the sovereign than to the great state functions, pomp, festivities, solennities and public ceremonies." Except at the very beginning of its existence, as a fortress, and at the very end (nearly exclusively) as a museum building, the Louvre Palace has continuously hosted a variety of different activities.

Military facility

The Louvre started as a military facility and retained military uses during most of its history. The initial rationale in 1190 for building a reinforced fortress on the western end of the new fortifications of Paris was the lingering threat of English-held Normandy. After the construction of the Wall of Charles V, the Louvre was still part of the defensive arrangements for the city, as the wall continued along the Seine between it and the  farther west, but it was no longer on the frontline. In the next centuries, there was no rationale for specific defenses of the Louvre against foreign invasion, but the palace long retained defensive features such as moats to guard against the political troubles that regularly engulfed Paris. The Louvre hosted a significant arsenal in the 15th and most of the 16th centuries, until its transfer in 1572 to the facility that is now the Bibliothèque de l'Arsenal.

From 1697 on, the French state's collection of plans-reliefs was stored in the Grande Galerie, of which it occupied all the space by 1754 with about 120 items placed on wooden tables. The plans-reliefs were used to study and prepare defensive and offensive siege operations of the fortified cities and strongholds they represented. In 1777, as plans started being made to create a museum in the Grande Galerie, the plans-reliefs were removed to the Hôtel des Invalides, where most of them are still displayed in the Musée des Plans-Reliefs. Meanwhile, a collection of models of ships and navy yards, initially started by naval engineer Henri-Louis Duhamel du Monceau, was displayed between 1752 and 1793 in a  next to the Académie des Sciences's rooms on the first floor of the Lescot Wing. That collection later formed the core of the maritime museum created in 1827, which remained at the Louvre until 1943 and is now the Musée national de la Marine.

During Napoleon III's Louvre expansion, the new building program included barracks for the Imperial Guard in the new North (Richelieu) Wing, and for the Cent-gardes Squadron in the South (Denon) Wing.

Feudal apex

The round keep of Philip II's Louvre Castle became the symbolic location from which all the king's fiefs depended. The traditional formula for these, that they "depended on the king for his great keep of the Louvre" remained in use until the 18th century, long after the keep itself had been demolished in the 1520s.

Archive

Philip II also created a permanent repository for the royal archive at the Louvre, following the loss of the French kings' previously itinerant records at the Battle of Fréteval (1194). That archive, known as the Trésor des Chartes, was relocated under Louis IX to the Palais de la Cité in 1231.

The kingdom's diplomatic archives were kept in the Pavillon de l'Horloge until their transfer to Versailles in 1763, after which the archives of the Maison du Roi and of the  soon took their place. In 1770, the archives of the Chambre des Comptes were placed in the Louvre's attic, followed by the archives of the Marshals of France in 1778 and those of the Order of Saint Michael in 1780.

Prison

The Louvre became a high-profile prison in the immediate aftermath of the Battle of Bouvines in July 1214, as Ferdinand, Count of Flanders was taken into captivity by Philip II. Ferdinand stayed there for 12 years. Other celebrity inmates included Enguerrand IV de Coucy in the 1250s, Guy of Flanders in 1304, Bishop  in 1308–1313, Louis de Dampierre in 1310, Enguerrand de Marigny in 1314, John of Montfort in 1341–1345, Charles II of Navarre in 1356, and Jean III de Grailly from 1372 to his death there in 1375. The Louvre was reserved for high-ranking prisoners, while other state captives were held in the Grand Châtelet. Its use as a prison declined after the completion of the Bastille in the 1370s, but was not ended: for example, Antoine de Chabannes was held at the Louvre in 1462–1463, John II, Duke of Alençon in 1474–1476, and Leonora Dori in 1617 upon the assassination of her husband Concino Concini at the Louvre's entrance following Louis XIII's orders.

Treasury

Under Philip II and his immediate successors, the royal treasure was kept in the Paris precinct of the Knights Templar, located at the present-day Square du Temple. King Philip IV created a second treasury at the Louvre, whose first documented evidence dates from 1296. Following the suppression of the Templars' Order by the same Philip IV in the early 14th century, the Louvre became the sole location of the king's treasury in Paris, which remained there in various forms until the late 17th century.

Place of worship

By contrast to the Palais de la Cité with its soaring Sainte-Chapelle, the religious function was never particularly prominent at the Louvre. The royal household used the nearby Saint-Germain l'Auxerrois as their parish church. A chapel of modest size was built by Louis IX in the 1230s in the western wing, whose footprint remains in the southern portion of the Lescot Wing's lower main room. In the 1580s, King Henry III projected to build a large chapel and then a convent in the space between the Louvre and the Seine, but only managed to demolish some of the existing structures on that spot.

At the time when Louis XIV resided at the Louvre, a new chapel was established on the first floor of the Pavillon de l'Horloge and consecrated on 18 February 1659 as Our Lady of Peace and of Saint Louis, the reference to peace being made in the context of negotiation with Spain that resulted later that year in the Treaty of the Pyrenees. This room was of double height, including what is now the pavilion's second floor (or attic). In 1915, the Louvre's architect  considered restoring that volume to its original height of more than 12 meters, but did not complete that plan.

On 2 April 1810, Percier and Fontaine had the Salon Carré temporarily redecorated and converted into a chapel for the wedding of Napoleon and Marie Louise of Austria. Meanwhile, in planning the Louvre's expansion and reunion with the Tuileries, Napoleon insisted that a major church should be part of the complex. In 1810 Percier and Fontaine made plans to build it on the northern side of the present-day Cour Napoléon. The church was to be dedicated to Saint Napoleon, a hitherto obscure figure promoted by Napoleon as patron saint of his incipient dynasty (Napoleon also instituted a national holiday on his birthday on 15 August and called it the ). It was intended to "equal in greatness and magnificence that of the Château de Versailles" (i.e. the Palace Chapel). Percier and Fontaine initiated work on the Rotonde de Beauvais, which was completed during Napoleon III's Louvre expansion, but the construction of the main church building was never started.

Home of national representation

In 1303, the Louvre was the venue of the second-ever meeting of France's Estates General, in the wake of the first meeting held the previous year at Notre-Dame de Paris. In 1593, another session of the Estates General was held in the Louvre, one floor up compared with 1303 following reconstruction as the Lescot Wing. That session, however, was without the presence of king Henry IV and organized by the Catholic League with a view to replacing him. The next session of the Estates General in 1614–1615 was held in the larger room of the Hôtel du Petit-Bourbon, in effect a contiguous dependency of the Louvre at that time.

During the July Monarchy, the yearly opening session was located at the Palais Bourbon, but it was brought back to the Louvre under the Second Empire. From 1857 onwards, the new  in the South (Denon) Wing of Napoleon III's Louvre expansion was used for that purpose.

That role of the Louvre disappeared following the end of the French monarchy in 1870. As a legacy of the temporary relocation of both assemblies in the Palace of Versailles in the 1870s, their joint sessions have been held there ever since, in a room that was purpose-built for that use and completed in 1875 in the Versailles palace's South Wing.

Royal residence

For centuries, the seat of executive power in Paris had been established at the Palais de la Cité, at or near the spot where Julian had been proclaimed Roman Emperor back in 360 CE. The political turmoil that followed the death of Philip IV, however, led to the emergence of rival centers of power in and around Paris, of which the Louvre was one. In 1316 Clementia of Hungary, the widow of recently deceased king Louis X, spent much of her pregnancy at the Château de Vincennes but resided at the Louvre when she gave birth to baby king John I on 15 November 1316, who died five days later. John was thus both the only king of France born at the Louvre, and almost certainly the only one who died there (Henry IV is now generally believed to have died before his carriage arrived at the Louvre following his fatal stabbing in the rue de la Ferronnerie on 14 May 1610). Philip VI occasionally resided at the Louvre, as documented by some of his letters in mid-1328. King John II is also likely to have resided at the Louvre in 1347, since his daughter Joan of Valois was betrothed there to Henry of Brabant on 21 June 1347, and his short-lived daughter Marguerite was born at the Louvre on 20 September 1347.

Charles V of France, who had survived the invasion of the Cité by Étienne Marcel's partisans in 1358, decided that a less central location would be preferable for his safety. In 1360 he initiated the construction of the Hôtel Saint-Pol, which became his main place of residence in Paris. Upon becoming king in 1364, he started transforming the Louvre into a permanent and more majestic royal residence, even though he stayed there less often than at the Hôtel Saint-Pol. After Charles V's death, his successor Charles VI also mainly stayed at the Hôtel Saint-Pol, but as he was incapacitated by mental illness, his wife Isabeau of Bavaria resided in the Louvre and ruled from there.

Later 15th-century kings did not reside in the Louvre, nor did either Francis I or Henry II even as they partly converted the Louvre as a Renaissance palace. The royal family only came back to reside in the newly rebuilt complex following Catherine de' Medici's abandonment of the Hôtel des Tournelles after her husband Henry II's traumatic death there in July 1559. From then, the king and court would stay mainly in the Louvre between 1559 and 1588 when Henry III escaped Paris, then between 1594 and 1610 under Henry IV. Beyond his minority, Louis XIII did not much reside in the Louvre and preferred the suburban residences of Saint-Germain-en-Laye (where Louis XIV was born on 5 September 1638, and where Louis XIII himself died on 14 May 1643) and Fontainebleau (where Louis XIII had been born on 27 September 1601). Louis XIV stayed away from the Louvre during the Fronde between 1643 and 1652, and departed from there following the death of his mother in 1666. Louis XV only briefly resided in the Louvre's  in 1719, as the Tuileries were undergoing refurbishment.

Both Louis XIV in the 1660s and Napoleon in the 1810s made plans to establish their main residence in the Colonnade Wing, but none of these respective projects came to fruition. Napoleon's attempt led to Percier and Fontaine's creation of the two monumental staircase on both ends of the wing, but was abandoned in February 1812.

Library

The next year he appointed , one of his officials, as the librarian. This action has been widely viewed as foundational, transitioning from the kings' prior practice of keeping books as individual objects to organizing a collection with proper cataloguing; as such, Charles V's library is generally considered a precursor to the French National Library, even though it was dismantled in the 15th century.

In 1767, a project to relocate the Royal Library from its site on rue de Richelieu into the Louvre was presented by Jacques-Germain Soufflot, endorsed by Superintendent de Marigny and approved by Louis XV, but remained stillborn for lack of funds. A similar project was endorsed by Napoleon from February 1805, for which Percier and Fontaine planned a new Library wing as the centerpiece of their program to fill the space between Louvre and Tuileries, but it was not implemented either.

A separate and smaller  was formed from book collections seized during the Revolution and grew during the 19th century's successive regimes. Initially located in the Tuileries in 1800, it was moved to the Grande Galerie's entresol in 1805. In 1860 it was moved to a new space created by Lefuel on the second floor of the new North (Richelieu) Wing of Napoleon III's Louvre expansion, whose main pavilion on the rue de Rivoli was accordingly named . It was destroyed by arson in May 1871 at the same time as the Tuileries, and only a few of its precious holdings could be saved.

The transfer of its collections to the new Institut National d'Histoire de l'Art was planned in the 1990s and executed in early 2016 after much delay.

Ceremonial venue

On the occasion of Holy Roman Emperor Charles IV's visit to Paris in 1377–1378, the main banquet was held at the Palais de la Cité but the French king used the Louvre's  on the next day to give a major speech on his political position in the conflict now known as the Hundred Years' War. The medieval Louvre's western wing was were the ceremonial spaces were located, and that geography did not change with the 16th century's reconstruction as Lescot Wing.

A number of betrothals and weddings were concluded and celebrated at the Louvre. These included the betrothal of Henry of Brabant and Joan of Valois on 21 June 1347, the weddings of Charles of Orléans and Isabella of Valois on 9 November 1389, of John of Brittany and Joan of France on 30 July 1397, of Charles of France and Marie of Anjou on 18 December 1413, of Francis of Nevers and Marguerite of Bourbon-La Marche on 19 January 1538, of Francis of France and Mary Stuart on 19 April 1558, of Duke Charles III of Lorraine and Claude of France on 19 January 1559; the betrothal of Edward VI of England and Elisabeth of Valois on 20 June 1559; the weddings of Henry of Navarre and Margaret of Valois on 19 August 1572, of François de Bourbon and Jeanne de Coesme on 17 December 1582, of Louis II of Condé (the "Grand Condé") and Claire-Clémence de Maillé on 7 February 1641, of Charles Amadeus of Savoy and Élisabeth de Bourbon on 11 July 1643, of Armand de Bourbon and Anne Marie Martinozzi on 21 February 1654, and of Henri Jules of Condé and Anne Henriette of Bavaria on 11 December 1663.

A few years later, minister André Malraux started a tradition of public ceremonies in the Cour Carrée to celebrate recently deceased French cultural luminaries.

Guest residence for foreign sovereigns and royals

The Louvre was the Parisian home of the Emperors who came to visit France: Holy Roman Emperor Charles IV stayed there in early 1378; Byzantine Emperor Manuel II from June 1400 to November 1402, using it as his base for several trips across Europe; Holy Roman Emperor Sigismund in March and April 1416; and Holy Roman Emperor Charles V in early January 1540.

In the late 1640s as the royal family had temporarily left the Louvre, Queen Henrietta Maria of England spent some of her Parisian exile in the apartment of the Queen Mother, on the ground floor of the southern wing of the Cour Carrée, where in early February 1649 she learned about the execution of her husband Charles I.

In 1722, the same apartment became the temporary residence of Infanta Mariana Victoria of Spain, who was promised to marry the young Louis XV (she then moved to Versailles, and in 1725 returned to Spain following the cancelation of the marriage project).

In the 1860s, Napoleon III decided to create a prestige apartment for visiting sovereigns in the Aile de Flore, close to his own apartment in the Tuileries Palace. Lefuel designed it with a monumental , the decoration of which he led between 1873 and 1878 even though the monarchy had fallen in the meantime. That project, however, was left unfinished, and in 1901–1902 its richly decorated upper section was repurposed into a room which is now the study gallery of the Louvre's department of graphical arts.

Court house

In 1505, as the Châtelet underwent renovation works, its judicial functions were temporarily hosted in the Louvre.

Under Henry IV, the Parlement de Paris was summoned by the king to hold sessions at the Louvre rather than at its traditional venue of the Palais de la Cité.

The Louvre again hosted a judiciary institution when the Conseil d'État was located there between 1824 and 1832. It was awarded the first floor of the Lemercier Wing On the western side of the Cour Carrée, and remained there until 1832. The painted ceilings of that era, installed in 1827, are still preserved with allegorical themes related to French history and legislation.

This word, however, refers to its architectural setting, providing a monumental stand for the royal family to watch and dominate the functions held in the Great Hall, and not to a judicial role.

Execution site

The Louvre was the scene of capital punishment on various occasions. During the French Revolution between 21 August 1792 and 11 May 1793, the guillotine was installed on the Place du Carrousel in front of the Tuileries Palace. It was relocated to the Place de la Concorde (then known as ), first on a one-off basis for the execution of Louis XVI on 21 January 1793, and then permanently in May of the same year.

Entertainment venue

Entertainment performances such as tournaments, games, balls and theater were a core part of court life at the time when the Louvre was a royal residence. On the night of 5 February 1606, a torch-lit carrousel was performed in the Louvre's courtyard between midnight and 5 am, with the monarchs and courtiers watching from their apartments' windows. In 1610, a gladiator-style fight between a man and a lion was organized in the courtyard, which King Henry IV also watched from inside the building. In February 1625 and 1626 respectively, two major ballets burlesques directed by Daniel Rabel were performed in the Louvre's Lower Great Room (now ), with Louis XIII himself appearing as one of the dancers.

Theatrical representations were particularly significant in the period following the return of the court to the Louvre in 1652. Following that performance's success, he was granted use of a space first in the Hôtel du Petit-Bourbon and then, after the latter's demolition to make space for the Louvre Colonnade, at the Palais-Royal. Molière again performed at the Louvre on 29 January 1664 when he directed , with Louis XIV himself playing a cameo role as an Egyptian, in the main room of the Queen Mother on the ground floor of the Cour Carrée's southern wing. On 17 November 1667, Jean Racine's  was created at the Louvre in Louis XIV's presence.

Some lavish entertainment performances left such a mark on collective memory that parts of the Louvre came to be named after them.

Napoleon decided to build a new venue for the Paris Opera as part of his project to complete the Louvre and its reunion with the Tuileries. In 1810 Percier and Fontaine planned a new opera house north of what is now the Cour Napoléon, on a similar footprint to the present-day , with main entrance on the northern side facing the Palais-Royal. That project, however, was not implemented. Nor was Napoleon III's plan in the 1860s to build a large theater room in the Aile de Marsan as a symmetrical counterpart to the  he created in the southern Aile de Flore.

Samuel Beckett's play named Play had its French premiere there on 11 June 1964, directed by Jean-Marie Serreau.

Residence of artists and craftsmen

On 22 December 1608, Henry IV published letters patent heralding his decision to invite hundreds of artists and craftsmen to live and work on the floors under the Grande Galerie. Simultaneously, Henry established a tapestry factory there, which remained until its transfer to the Gobelins Manufactory in 1671. Creators who lived under the Grande Galerie in the 17th and 18th centuries included Louis Le Vau, Théophraste Renaudot from 1648 to 1653, André Charles Boulle, Jean-Baptiste Pigalle, Augustin Pajou, Maurice Quentin de La Tour, Claude-Joseph Vernet, Carle Vernet, Horace Vernet (who was born there), Jean-Baptiste Greuze, Jean-Honoré Fragonard, and Hubert Robert.

Following the departure of the royal court to Versailles in the 1670s, a number of individuals, many of which were artists, obtained the privilege to establish their residence in parts of the formerly royal palace. These included Jacques-Louis David in the southeastern corner of the Cour Carrée and Charles-André van Loo in the Galerie d'Apollon. On 20 August 1801, Napoleon had the artists and others who lived in the Cour Carrée all expelled, and in 1806 put a final end to the creators' lodgings under the Grande Galerie.

Royal mint

In July 1609, Henry IV transferred the mint to a space the Grande Galerie, from its previous location on the Île de la Cité.

It closed during the French Revolution but was revived in 1804 by Vivant Denon. By imperial decree of 5 March 1806, it was relocated from the Louvre to the Hôtel des Monnaies where the  had moved in 1775.

Residence of senior courtiers and officials

In the 17th century, the second floor of the Pavillon du Roi was the home of Charles d'Albert, duc de Luynes until 1621, then of Gaston, Duke of Orléans, and from 1652 of Cardinal Mazarin who also established his nieces in the second-floor attic of the Lescot Wing.. Nicolas Fouquet and his successor Jean-Baptiste Colbert similarly lived on the upper floors of the Pavillon du Roi, above the King's bedchamber.

New prestige apartments for regime dignitaries were created as part of Napoleon III's Louvre expansion. The main one, in the North (Richelieu) Wing, became the apartment of the Finance Minister after 1871, and as such featured prominently in Raymond Depardon's documentary , shot during the presidential election campaign of then minister Valéry Giscard d’Estaing in early 1974. Part of that large apartment was converted in the 1990s into the museum's exhibition space for northern European sculpture, while another part has been used since 1912 as offices for the Louvre's director and their staff. Lefuel also created two successive apartments for the Louvre's director Émilien de Nieuwerkerke, the first in former rooms of the Académie de peinture, and when these had to be demolished to build the Escalier Daru, on the first floor of the Cour Carrée's northern wing.

Several tied cottages still exist in the Pavillon de Flore, including one for the museum's Director. Other apartments in the same pavilion are reserved for senior personnel tasked with the museum's security and maintenance, so that they stay close in case their presence is needed for an emergency.

National printing house

A first printing workshop appeared in the Louvre in the 1620s.

In the early 1850s in the early stages of Napoleon III's Louvre expansion, projects were made to relocate the national printing house (then known as ) in the new building of the Louvre, now the Richelieu Wing. These plans were criticized by Ludovic Vitet among others, and were not implemented.

Academic and educational facility

In the late 17th century, the Louvre started to become the seat of the French royal academies. First, in 1672 Colbert allowed the Académie Française to meet on the ground floor of the Pavillon du Roi, in the Guards' Room of the former Queen Mother's apartment. Soon the Académie moved to the ground floor of the Lemercier Wing On the Cour Carrée, and also maintained its library there. The Académie des Inscriptions joined it in nearby rooms. The Académie royale d'architecture moved to the Queen's apartment (in the southern wing of the Cour Carrée) in 1692. After a fire in 1740 it moved to the ground floor of the north wing. The , a diplomats' training school, took over in the 1710s the large room on the third floor of the Pavillon de l'Horloge (now partitioned into offices).

From 1725, the Salon Carré, recently vacated with the return to Spain of the child Mariana Victoria, was used by the Académie royale de peinture et de sculpture for its yearly exhibition, which took from it its name of Salon. From 1763, the Académie also overtook the Galerie d'Apollon.

During the French Revolution, all academies were deemed to be fatally tainted by the Ancien régime associations and terminated on 8 August 1793. Barely more than two years later, however, they were recreated as the Institut de France on 24 October 1795, ceremonially inaugurated in the Lescot Wing's ground-floor room (the Louvre's ) on 4 April 1796. On 20 March 1805 Napoleon decided to relocate the Institut from the Louvre to its current seat at the former Collège des Quatre-Nations, which had been closed in 1791.

The Salon restarted on a yearly basis in the Salon Carré, until the Revolution of 1848. That year, the Louvre's energetic new director Philippe-Auguste Jeanron had it relocated to the Tuileries, so that the Salon Carré could be fully devoted to the museum's permanent exhibition. From 1857 the salon moved on from there to the newly built Palais de l'Industrie.

The École du Louvre was created in 1882 with the mission to "extract from the collections the knowledge they contain, and to train curators, missionaries and excavators". The school's curriculum originally focused on archaeology but soon expanded to related disciplines, such as art history and museography. It was replaced in the 1990s by the still larger , also underground on the northern end of the Carrousel du Louvre. The former  was then transformed into exhibition rooms in which the Louvre's Coptic art collection is now displayed, including the architectonic pieces from Bawit.

Museum

Securities exchange

The national securities exchange (or ) was located at the Louvre between 10 May 1795 and 9 September 1795, in Anne of Austria's former summer apartment on the ground floor of the Petite Galerie. This followed nearly two years of closure during which off-exchange speculation on Assignats went wild, after decades of operation of the Bourse in the Hôtel de Nevers from 24 September 1724 to 27 June 1793. In September 1795 the Bourse again closed for a few months; it reopened in January 1796 in the Church of Notre-Dame-des-Victoires where it stayed until 1807.

Administrative office building

During the Ancien Régime, administrative staff numbers in the machinery of government remained small and were dwarfed by the number of courtiers and domestic servants. That changed in the 19th century as the administrative arms of the state became increasingly significant, and the Louvre as a quintessential government building reflected that new reality. The installation of the Conseil d'État in the Lemercier Wing between 1824 and 1832 was a first step, since that body has administrative as well as judiciary competencies.

The office footprint within the Louvre increased considerably with Napoleon III's expansion. The new North (Richelieu) Wing included offices for use by various ministries: 
 Plans were also made to locate the Directorate of Telegraphs and relocate the national printing office in the northern wing, but were not implemented.
 The , created in early 1870, was also briefly located in the northern wing;

On 29 May 1871, a mere few days after the Tuileries' fire, France's government head Adolphe Thiers attributed all administrative offices and barracks space in the Louvre's northern wing to the French Finance Ministry, whose buildings on the other side of the rue de Rivoli had been entirely destroyed. The Finance Ministry remained there for more than a century, until the late 1980s. A meeting of finance ministers of the Group of Seven countries, hosted at the Louvre on 22 February 1987, gave its name to the Louvre Accord.

Only archives of the Court were deposited there in 1884, however, and these spaces were eventually attributed in 1897 to what is now the Musée des Arts Décoratifs.

The Ministry of Colonies was installed in the Flore Wing from 1893 to 1909. The museum then planned to expand into the Flore Wing but that was thwarted during World War I as the facility was used by the wartime bond issuance service. The Finance Ministry, together with the  it created in 1933, remained there and stayed until 1961.

The Louvre museum itself keeps offices in various parts of the building, e.g. in the former apartment of the Great Equerry (museum direction), on the top floors of the Pavillon de l'Horloge, and in part of the entresol under the Grande Galerie.

City Hall of Paris

The new City Hall was formally inaugurated on 13 July 1882 but it took significantly longer to finish the interior works, with some ceremonial rooms only completed in 1906. The  left the Louvre in 1887 to its current City Hall location. The offices of the Prefecture and apartment of Préfet Eugène Poubelle remained in the Pavillon de Flore until 1893, when they were replaced by the Ministry of Colonies, despite a 1883 order that had transferred the entire  to the museum.

Sculpture garden
 

While the Louvre is rich with architectural sculpture, its position in the midst of a bustling city neighborhood was long unfavorable to the display of freestanding sculpture, with few exceptions that included the temporary display of a colossal statue of Vulcan in the Louvre's courtyard during Charles V's visit in 1540. In the early 17th century, a bronze sculpture by Francesco Bordoni was erected at the center of the Queen's garden, now  to the south of the Pavillon du Roi.

During the 19th century, the Louvre's open spaces multiplied and the public taste for sculpture and monuments simultaneously increased. An early project was made in the late 1820s to place the Great Sphinx of Tanis in the center of the Cour Carrée, but was not implemented.

Instead, on 28 October 1845 an equestrian statue of Ferdinand Philippe, Duke of Orléans was placed on that spot, itself a second cast of a monument by Carlo Marochetti erected in Algiers earlier that year. But that did not last long, and the statue was relocated to Versailles shortly after the Revolution of 1848 (it was moved again in 1971 to its present location at the Château d'Eu). In the early Second Empire, plans were made to erect equestrian statues of Francis I in the Cour Carrée and Charlemagne and Napoleon respectively in the two squares of the Cour Napoléon. A plaster model of Auguste Clésinger's equestrian Francis I was placed in the Cour Carrée between December 1855 to February 1856, when it was transferred to the Crystal Palace on Sydenham Hill in London. On 15 January 1863 Clésinger was also tasked to create the statue of Charlemagne, on which he worked until 1871. The statue of Napoleon was commissioned on 26 August 1862 from then-prominent sculptor Eugène Guillaume, who apparently only produced several small-scale models.

Sculpted monuments mushroomed around the Louvre in the late 19th and early 20th century. Most of them were removed in 1933 on the initiative of Education Minister Anatole de Monzie, due to changing tastes:
 Marble version of the group titled , a celebration of the resistance of Belfort during the Franco-Prussian War by Antonin Mercié, installed in 1894 in the Carrousel Garden, removed in 1933 and now at Fort Mont-Valérien
 Marble statue of Paris during the War 1914–1918 by Albert Bartholomé (1921), removed in 1933 and kept in a damaged state in the Bois de Vincennes

In 1907 , then an undersecratary of state in charge of France's fine arts policy, fostered the creation of a sculpture garden in the western octagonal garden of the Cour Napoléon, dubbed the "campo santo". The monumental bronze group Le Temps et le Génie de l’Art by Victor Ségoffin was placed in the center in 1908. Around it were allegorical and commemorative sculptures: 
 The sons of Cain, bronze by Paul Landowski (1906), now in the Tuileries Garden
 Pierre de Montreuil, marble by Henri Bouchard (1909), since 1935 in a public garden next to the Basilica of Saint-Denis
 Michel Colombe, bronze by Jean Boucher (1909), moved to Tours in 1933 and melted in 1942
 Poussin, marble by Constant Roux (1911), since 1934 in Les Andelys
 Watteau, marble by Henri-Édouard Lombard (1909), since 1937 in front of the Musée des Beaux-Arts de Valenciennes
 Houdon, marble by Paul Gasq (1909), since 1935 in Lisieux
 Corot, marble by François-Raoul Larche (1908), since 1935 in Ville-d'Avray
Two more memorials, of Rude by Sicard and Chardin by Larche, were commissioned but not completed. All these sculptures, except Landowski's Sons of Cain, were also removed in 1933. Ségoffin's group was transferred to the southern French town of Saint-Gaudens in 1935, and melted down during World War II.

This initiative had been sponsored in 1899 by American diplomat Robert John Thompson in gratitude of the French gift of the Statue of Liberty, and originally intended for a dedication at Lafayette's grave at the Picpus Cemetery during the Exposition Universelle of 1900. In preparation for the Grand Louvre remodeling, the Lafayette monument was moved in 1985 to its current location on the Cours-la-Reine.

In 1964, Culture Minister André Malraux decided to install in the Carrousel Garden 21 bronze sculptures by Aristide Maillol which had been donated to the French state by the sculptor's former model and muse, Dina Vierny, including casts of Air, Action in Chains, The Mountain, and The River. The Maillol statues were rearranged during the overhaul of the garden in the 1990s.

Most recently, as part of the Grand Louvre project designed by I. M. Pei, a cast made in lead in 1986 of the marble Equestrian statue of Louis XIV by Gian Lorenzo Bernini has been placed in the Cour Napoléon, in front of the Louvre Pyramid and marking the end of Paris's . This was intended as a tribute to Bernini's past role as architect of the Louvre in 1664–1666, even though his plans were not executed.

Research facility

The  was created in 1932 to support research on paintings and leverage new analysis techniques.

Dining and shopping venue

The Louvre palace is host to several restaurants and cafés.

Close to the Louvre Palace's northwestern tip, the restaurant  opened in 2016 in the Aile de Marsan with a terrace on the Carrousel Garden, designed by Joseph Dirand and replacing a previous restaurant on the same spot, . A high-end restaurant named  opened in 1989 on the mezzanine of the Hall Napoléon, under the Louvre Pyramid, and was operated by chef Yves Pinard; its inaugural event was the dinner of the 15th G7 summit.

From 1608 to 1806, the ground floor of the Grande Galerie hosted a number of shops in which artists and artisans peddled their creations. They were closed by order of Napoleon. Aside from museum shops, the Louvre experienced a revival of retail commercial activity with the opening in 1993 of the Carrousel du Louvre shopping mall, whose largest slot was initially leased by a Virgin Megastore until 2012, and by Printemps since 2014. France's first Apple Store was also located there and operated from 2009 to 2018.

Chronological plan of the construction of the Louvre

The oldest part of the above-ground Louvre is the southwest corner of the square block that faces the center of Paris to the east. This corner section, consisting of the Lescot Wing (1) and the north side of the western part of the south wing (2), was designed and constructed in the 16th century by Pierre Lescot, who replaced the corresponding wings of the medieval Louvre (not shown). Later that century, the Petite Galerie (4) was added, connecting the Louvre to the section of the wall of Charles V which ran along the north bank of the Seine toward the Tuileries Palace (3, 5, 8, 11, 14; destroyed by fire in 1871). Around 1600, during the reign of Henry IV, the wall along the river was replaced with the Grande Galerie (6, 7), which provided a covered passage from the Louvre to Tuileries Palace and later was the first part of the Louvre to become a museum. The Lescot Wing was expanded north with the Lemercier Wing (9) under Louis XIII, and in the second half of the 17th century, during the reign of Louis XIV, the Petite Galerie was enlarged (10, 13) and the remaining wings around the Square Court (12, 16) were constructed, but not totally completed until the first part of the 19th century under Napoleon, who also added the Arc du Carrousel (17) and parts of the north wing (17) along the rue de Rivoli. Later in the 19th century, the north wing was slightly extended (18) by Louis XVIII. From 1852 to 1857, Napoleon III connected the north wing to the buildings surrounding the Square Court with the Richelieu Wing (19, north part) and enlarged the Grande Galerie with the Denon Wing (19, south part).  In 1861–1870 his architect Hector Lefuel carried out further work, replacing the Pavillon de Flore and the western section of the Grande Galerie (7) and adding the Pavillon des Sessions (20, also known as the Pavillon des États). In 1874–1880 he replaced the Pavillon de Marsan (15) and extended the south facade of the adjacent Marsan Wing (21).

Photo gallery

See also
 Palais de la Cité
 Versailles Palace

Notes

References
 Ayers, Andrew (2004). The Architecture of Paris. Stuttgart; London: Edition Axel Menges. .
 Ballon, Hilary (1991). The Paris of Henri IV: Architecture and Urbanism. Cambridge, Massachusetts: The MIT Press. .
 Berger, Robert W. (1993). The Palace of the Sun: The Louvre of Louis XIV. University Park: The Pennsylvania State University Press. .
 Berty, Adolphe (1868). Topographie historique du vieux Paris. Région du Louvre et des Tuileries. Tome 2. Paris: Imprimerie Impériale. Copy at Gallica.
 Bezombes, Dominique, editor (1994). The Grand Louvre: History of a Project. Paris: Moniteur. .
 Biasini, Émile; Lebrat, Jean; Bezombes, Dominique; Vincent, Jean-Michel (1989). The Grand Louvre: A Museum Transfigured 1981–1993. Paris: Electa Moniteur. .
 Blunt, Anthony; Beresford, Richard (1999). Art and architecture in France, 1500–1700. New Haven: Yale University Press. .
 Bresc-Bautier, Genevieve (1995). The Louvre: An Architectural History. New York: The Vendome Press. .
 Briggs, Keith (2008). "The Domesday Book castle LVVRE". Journal of the English Place-Name Society, vol. 40, pp. 113–118. Retrieved 16 February 2013.
 Christ, Yvan (1949). Le Louvre et les Tuileries : Histoire architecturale d'un double palais. [Paris]:  Éditions "Tel". .
 Edwards, Henry Sutherland (1893). Old and New Paris: Its History, Its People, and Its Places. Paris: Cassell. View at Google Books. Retrieved 30 April 2008.
 Hanser, David A. (2006). Architecture of France. Westport, Connecticut: Greenwood Press. .
 Hautecoeur, Louis (1940). Histoire du Louvre: Le Château – Le Palais – Le Musée, des origines à nos jours, 1200–1940, 2nd edition. Paris: Administration provisoire d'imprimerie. .
 Lowry, Bates (1956). Palais du Louvre, 1528–1624: The Development of a Sixteenth-Century Architectural Complex (thesis/dissertation). University of Chicago. . ProQuest
 Mignot, Claude (1999). The Pocket Louvre: A Visitor's Guide to 500 Works. New York: Abbeville Press. .
 Ochterbeck, Cynthia Clayton, editor (2009). The Green Guide Paris, pp. 168–201. Greenville, South Carolina: Michelin Maps and Guides. .
 Sauval, Henri (1724). Histoire et recherches des antiquités de la ville de Paris, vol. 2, Paris: C. Moette and J. Chardon. Copy at Google Books.
 Sturdy, David (1995). Science and social status: the members of the Académie des sciences 1666–1750. Woodbridge, Suffolk, U.K.: Boydell Press. . Preview at Google Books.

External links
 
 
 A virtual visit of the Louvre
 Panoramic view of the pyramid and the Cour Napoléon

 
Châteaux in Paris
Castles in Île-de-France
Louvre